Anatoliy Gorshkov (born 4 August 1958) is a Ukrainian former racewalking athlete who competed mainly in the 20 kilometres race walk event. His best result was a bronze medal at the 1987 IAAF World Race Walking Cup, where he achieved his lifetime best of 1:20:04 hours for the 20 km walk.

He twice represented the Soviet Union at the World Championships in Athletics, competing in 1983 and 1987. He competed five times at the IAAF World Race Walking Cup, including twice for Ukraine in 1995 and 1997. In the latter year, he took part in the 50 kilometres race walk and achieved a best of 4:01:01 hours.

His highest seasonal European ranking was third in 1987, behind fellow Soviet Viktor Mostovik and East Germany's Axel Noack.

International competitions

References

External links

Living people
1958 births
Ukrainian male racewalkers
Soviet male racewalkers
World Athletics Championships athletes for the Soviet Union